Mordellistena altifrons is a species of beetle in the genus Mordellistena of the family Mordellidae. It was discovered in 1928.

References

altifrons
Beetles described in 1928